The Nike Air Max 97 is part of the Nike Air Max line of shoes sold and released by Nike, Inc.

Overview 
The Nike Air Max 97 was first released in 1997. The design of the shoe is commonly thought to be inspired by the bullet
trains of Japan, but the design was inspired by mountain bikes.  The Air Max 97 was Nike's first shoe that introduced full-length air. The Air Max 97 also introduced a hidden lacing system. Due to the influence of Japanese bullet trains, the Air Max 97 silver colorway was nicknamed the "silver bullet."

Popularity and impact 
Upon release in 1997, the Air Max 97 retailed at $150, about $10 dollars more than its predecessors. The shoe enjoyed much popularity in Italy, where it was re-released in 2007 for its 10th anniversary.

The year 2017 marked the 20th anniversary of the Air Max 97. Nike marked the occasion by releasing many colorways and collaborations.

In March 2021, musician Lil Nas X collaborated with viral marketing company MSCHF to release "Satan Shoes", which were black Nike Air Max 97 shoes with satanic theming and created with "1 drop of human blood". The shoes were limited to 666 pairs, and caused controversy upon release, leading to Nike issuing a lawsuit against MSCHF. MSCHF had previously released "Jesus Shoes", a range of white Air Max 97 shoes which contained "60cc of holy water from the River Jordan".

Air Max Day 

March 26 has been officially declared by Nike as Air Max Day. First launched by Nike in 2014, Nike wanted to highlight the popularity of the Nike Air Max.

References

External links 
 

Nike brands
Products introduced in 1997
Shoes
Sneaker culture